Iža (Hungarian pronunciation:) is a village in south-western Slovakia.

Geography 
It is situated in the Komárno District of Slovakia's Nitra Region, very close to the town of Komárno.

History 

The biggest Roman castellum in present-day Slovakia was located in Celemantia, an ancient settlement discovered on the territory of Iža. Celemantia was already mentioned by Claudius Ptolemaios in the 2nd century CE and it was abandoned in around 400 CE. The modern village of Iža was first mentioned in 1268.

Kelemantia was probably a bridgehead for the larger fortress of Brigetio, across the river near Komárom. But it was still fairly big, at  square. The excavated and partly reconstructed fort, which is accessible via a rough lane from Iža, was the second to be built on the site. Parts of these structures are now visible and described by information boards in four languages, including English.

The first fort on the site, whose foundations have been partly surveyed, was an earth and timber construction. It is believed to have been destroyed by barbarian attacks less than five years after it was built. Evidence of temporary encampments nearby - presumably built to house the large expeditionary force despatched by Rome to wallop the natives in turn - were revealed by an aerial survey in 1990.

In the 9th century, the territory of Iža became part of the Kingdom of Hungary. After the Austro-Hungarian army disintegrated in November 1918, Czechoslovak troops occupied the area, later acknowledged internationally by the Treaty of Trianon. Between 1938 and 1945 Iža once more  became part of Miklós Horthy's Hungary through the First Vienna Award. From 1945 until the Velvet Divorce, it was part of Czechoslovakia. Since then it has been part of Slovakia.

Sights 

 Roman Castellum and Settlement - Roman military camp Celemantia is located 7 km east of Komárno in the village of Iža, on the bank of Danube. There are no doubts that the Romans during their greatest territorial expansion came to the far North and crossed the Danube river. A memento of their former presence is also a military camp Celemantia that originated near the village of Iža during the reign of Emperor Marcus Aurelius. The camp was part of the famous border defense system Limes Romanus, which however fell in the year 179 after the raid of Germanic tribes.
 Roman and Ethnographical Museum - In Iža you can find Kelemantia Roman and Ethnographic Museum, which was opened in 2013. The museum was created as part of the project "Connecting to an international tourist route: In the footsteps of Romans on the Danube". There are two expositions in the museum: Roman and ethnographic.
 Turkish Bridge - Not far from the pumping-station, on the bank of the River Danube there is a tiny bridge with arched supporting structure. It is said that the bridge remained form the turkish times, its name is the „Turkish Bridge“ and it is in good technical conditions.
 The monument of the victims of World War I.- Next to the Catholic church is a monument to those who fell in World War I.
The monument of the victims of World War II. - The monument to those who fell in World War II with the names stands around the center of the cemetery. The monument was built in 1996 and is made of artificial stone.
The flood memorial from 1965 - In a small park on the main street (opposite the sports field) there is a flood memorial from 1965. 
 The Persei-mill - At the end of the village on the left side there is the Persei-mill, which was built by Lajos Persei in 1939. The remained part functions as a store today.
 The Géza-chapel - The graveyard is for people of Catholic, Evangelic and Reformed religion. A remarkable point of the cemetery is the small chapel of the Kurucz family, the Géza-chapel. The memorial of Lujza Kurucz is the artwork of János Nagy, on the left. Behind the chapel, on the highest point of the cemetery, stands the main cross with two graves of local priests in front of it (Kálmán Nádai, parson of Iža (1884-1956), Károly Jánoki priest (1782-1840)). The main cross is made of red marble from the village Süttő, Hungary, created in baroque style. As a rarity we can mention the white wooden crosses of the cemetery, covered with small triangle roof, which can not be found elsewhere. The second main, red-marble cross of the cemetery is from the year 1878. We can see a typical Hungarian wooden column, the work of the Transylvanian (Romania) wood-carving master Sándor Felszegi. The typical carved Transylvanian gate is also his work from the year 2018. 
Sandstone statue of St. John Nepomuk - Next to the Catholic church, about thirty steps from the monument to the fallen in World War I, stands on a marble pedestal (marble is from the village of Süttő in MR) sandstone statue of St. John Nepomuk. 
St. Michael, the Archangel Roman Catolic Church - The Catholic church, which was probably built in the 16th century, has its main axis running in an east-west direction, with a single nave, a sanctuary with a sacristy added on the south side. The church bears the name of St. Michael the Archangel. 
The Evangelical Church - The foundation stone of the Evangelical church in Iža was laid and consecrated on July 19, 1997, at a commemoration of the 50th anniversary of the settlement of Slovaks relocated from the Great Plain. 
The Reformed Church - The year of construction of the Reformed church is 1871. It has a rectangular floor plan and its interior is distinguished by its puritanism: benches, pulpit, lord's table and harmonium. Iron pillars hold the ceiling. Its windows are finished with a semicircle. 
The Sikul Gate - is located in front of the municipal office in 2018, is the work of woodcarver Sándor Felszegi of Székelyudvarhely (Romania). 
The Artesian well - In the middle of the village towards Štúrovo there is an artesian well, the water of which springs from a depth of 220 m. Above the well is a filagory where travelers can relax. 
The Bokors Saline Protected Area - Bokros is a tiny island home to special salt-loving species in the middle of an intensively cultivated agricultural landscape. It is the northernmost extension of the Hungarian saline steppes. This area is a habitat for special plant and animal species.

Actively 
Bicycle tour Komárno - Iža (Celemantia): Discover the unique cultural and natural beauty of the Danube region by bike. However, bicycling does not have to mean only hard physical activity. The beautiful panorama of the Danube also provides refreshment for the soul, cultural heritage and enriching programs with many pleasant feelings. Regional specialties, products and wines provide great gastronomic experiences. Thanks to the new cycling route, we can experience many different programs every day.

Demographics 
The village has a population of about 1,630 people. According to the 2001 census, the ethnic makeup was about 73% Hungarian, 25% Slovak, 1% Romany and 1% Czech.

Facilities 
The village has a public library, a gym and a football pitch.
Recently a new museum was opened in the village, which focuses specifically on the history of the Danube Lands

Genealogical resources

The records for genealogical research are available at the state archive "Statny Archiv in Nitra, Slovakia"

 Roman Catholic church records (births/marriages/deaths): 1722-1901 (parish A)
 Lutheran church records (births/marriages/deaths): 1783-1908 (parish B)
 Reformated church records (births/marriages/deaths): 1827-1895 (parish B)

See also
 List of municipalities and towns in Slovakia

References

External links
 
Roman Kastel Kelemantia of Iža Virtual Tour, National Cultural Heritage
https://web.archive.org/web/20071027094149/http://www.statistics.sk/mosmis/eng/run.html
Spectacular Slovakia - Iža: holding the line
Surnames of living people in Iza
https://www.visitdanube.eu/en/sights-5

Villages and municipalities in the Komárno District
Hungarian communities in Slovakia